Karad railway station  is a railway station serving Karad city, in Satara district of Maharashtra State of India. It is under Pune railway division of Central Railway Zone of Indian Railways. 

It is located at 596 m above sea level and has three platforms. As of 2018, a single broad gauge railway line exists and at this station, 39 trains stop. Kolhapur Airport is at distance of 76 kilometers.

References

Pune railway division
Railway stations in Satara district
Karad